Nedre Telemark District Court (Norwegian: Nedre Telemark tingrett) is a district court located in Skien, Norway.  It covers the municipalities of Skien, Bamble, Drangedal, Kragerø, Nome, Porsgrunn and Siljan, and is subordinate Agder Court of Appeal.

References

Defunct district courts of Norway
Organisations based in Skien